The former First Church of Christ, Scientist, built in 1907, is an historic Christian Science church edifice located at 1443–1451 North Prospect Avenue in Milwaukee, Wisconsin. It was designed in the Classical Revival style by noted Chicago architect Solon Spencer Beman, who designed at least a dozen other Christian Science churches across the country. On March 8, 1989, it was added to the National Register of Historic Places. Today it is occupied by 1451 Renaissance Place and is the venue for weddings and other social events as well as corporate events.

See also
 First Church of Christ, Scientist (disambiguation)
 List of former Christian Science churches, societies and buildings

References

Churches on the National Register of Historic Places in Wisconsin
Neoclassical architecture in Wisconsin
Former Christian Science churches, societies and buildings in Wisconsin
Churches completed in 1907
20th-century Christian Science church buildings
Buildings and structures in Milwaukee
Solon Spencer Beman church buildings
Historic districts on the National Register of Historic Places in Wisconsin
National Register of Historic Places in Milwaukee
Neoclassical church buildings in the United States